Clonmel RFC is an Irish rugby team based in Clonmel, County Tipperary in the province of Munster. They play in Division 2C of the All-Ireland League.

The club was founded in 1892, although has disbanded and reformed twice.

References

Irish rugby union teams
Rugby clubs established in 1892
Senior Irish rugby clubs (Munster)